Çaycuma is a town and district of Zonguldak Province in the Black Sea region of Turkey. The mayor is Bülent Kantarcı (CHP). The population of Çaycuma is 115,000, but the centre population is 21,300. Çaycuma is well known for yogurt in Zonguldak and Turkey.

References

 
Populated places in Zonguldak Province
Districts of Zonguldak Province